The Biyun Chan Temple was originally a century old Buddhist temple but was taken away and became a shrine for Chinese Communist Party. The former resident nun managed to regained ownership of the temple in 2019 and trying to restore the Buddhist temple. The temple is located in Ershui Township, Changhua County, Republic of China.

History
The century old Buddhist temple was constructed in 1920 and served as a place of worship for local Buddhist community. The temple hired Wei Ming-jen to build an expansion, but later lost the building to him due to a property rights dispute. He forcefully expelled the Buddhist nuns residing in the temple and converted it into a shrine for the Chinese Communist Party with the name Patriotic Education Base of Socialist National Thought in Taiwan Province of the People's Republic of China. He then covered the temple with the flags of the People's Republic of China (PRC) and the Chinese Communist Party. He also hung up portraits of Mao Zedong, Zhou Enlai and Xi Jinping.

On 11 September 2018, the Cultural Affairs Bureau of Changhua County Government held a review meeting to decide on the fate of the temple. On 21 September 2018, Changhua County Magistrate Wei Ming-ku ordered that illegal additions on the property be demolished. The demolition process will start from cutting the water and electricity supply to the building on the same day. The demolition day is expected to be on 26 September 2018. On 25 September 2018, around 20 people wearing the uniform of People's Liberation Army showed up at the shrine to show support for Wei. After the electricity was cut to the building, Wei used a portable generator to continue broadcasting the national anthem of the PRC.

On 26 September 2018, demolition works began to tear down the building. There were 14 heavy machinery present on the day to do the work. The work was supervised by Changhua County Deputy Commissioner Lin Ming-yu which he ordered to start at 10:05 a.m. The demolition work costed NT$4.9 million in which it would be borne by Wei's sister who owned the rights of the property. It also cost NT$300,000 for the police forces before and during the demolition works.

A day after the demolition work began, Wei retreated to Hong Kong. However, on 1 October 2018 evening, he returned to Taiwan to attend the National Day of the People's Republic of China held by the Patriot Alliance Association.

Architecture
The temple covered a total area of 2,500 m2 with the original temple remains cover only 185 m2.

See also
 Persecution of Buddhists
 List of tourist attractions in Taiwan

References

1920 establishments in Taiwan
2018 disestablishments in Taiwan
Demolished buildings and structures in Taiwan
Buildings and structures demolished in 2018